Pankowski is a surname. Notable people with the surname include: 

Annie Pankowski (born 1994), American ice hockey player
Marian Pankowski (1919-2011), Polish writer, poet, literary critic and translator
Rafał Pankowski (born 1976), Polish sociologist and political scientist

See also
Jankowski